Phyllonorycter tenuicaudella is a moth of the family Gracillariidae. It is known from Saint Croix, U.S. Virgin Islands.

References

tenuicaudella
Moths of North America
Moths described in 1897